Nihao, Ni Hao, or 你好 may refer to:
Ni Hao, Kai-Lan, American children's television show
你好，李焕英 or Hi, Mom, a 2021 Chinese comedy film

See also
Neoma (disambiguation)
Niihau, a Hawaiian island
My Huckleberry Friends, 2017 Chinese streaming television series
Last Letter (2018 film), 2018 Chinese romantic drama film
Mr. Siao's Mandarin Class or 你好 Mr. Siao!, 2009 Malaysian television series